Donja Čemernica is a village in central Croatia, in the municipality of Topusko, Sisak-Moslavina County. It is connected by the D6 highway.

History
The village of Čemernica (comprising Gornja Čemernica and Donja Čemernica) suffered heavy demographic losses in the World war II losing 586 of its residents, 295 of whom perished in the Glina massacre on 3 August 1941. Further 68 of its residents perished in the Jasenovac concentration camp.

Demographics
According to the 2011 census, the village of Donja Čemernica has 170 inhabitants. This represents 37.69% of its pre-war population according to the 1991 census.

The 1991 census recorded that 94.68% of the village population were ethnic Serbs (427/451), 0.66% were ethnic Croats (3/451), and 4.66% were of other ethnic origin (21/451).

NOTE: Data for settlements of 'Donja Čemernica' and Gornja Čemernica (which currently belongs to the municipality of Gvozd) was reported separately from 1890 onwards. From 1857 to 1880, data was reported for a single settlement of Čemernica.  The data pertaining to former settlement of Čemernica is now contained within the data for the settlement of Donja Čemernica.

Sights
 Monument to the uprising of the people of Kordun and Banija
 Partisan Airfield Čemernica was one of 34 partisan airfields (850m long airstrip) used in World war II in Yugoslavia. The first plane, which landed on 22 July 1944, evacuated 18 badly wounded partisans along with 26 children to Bari, Italy. One of many notable passengers who landed at the Čemernica Airfield was Randolph Churchill, who established the British military mission at Topusko on 16 September 1944.

Notable natives and residents

See also 
 Glina massacres

References

Populated places in Sisak-Moslavina County
Serb communities in Croatia